Southside is a neighborhood in Louisville, Kentucky, United States.  Its boundaries are Third Street to the west, Woodlawn Avenue, Allmond Avenue and Hiawatha Avenue to the north, the CSX railroad tracks to the east, and the southern boundary of the Greater Louisville Technology Park (formerly Naval Ordnance), Southside Drive and Kenwood Drive to the south.

The neighborhood has been settled by a wide array of immigrant groups, mostly refugees. 
Those from Vietnam dominated throughout most of the 1990s, but have since been succeeded by those from Cuba. 

37.6% were born in other countries to parents also born in other countries (first among all neighborhoods in the pre-merger city,) making up 1,976 of the total population of 5,260.
The top lands of national origin according to the online Statistical Atlas amongst the foreign-born: 

Cuba - 
19.1%
377
 
Burma - 
12.7%
251
 
Vietnam -  
8.6%
169
 
Mexico - 
7.0%
139
 
Iraq -
5.3%
104
  
Nepal -
4.5%
90
 
Bosnia and Herzegovina - 
3.5%
70
   
Haiti - 
3.2%
63

Iran - 
2.0%
40
  
Ethiopia - 
2.0%
39

References

https://insiderlouisville.com/communities/americana-community-helps-immigrant-refugee-populations/
https://statisticalatlas.com/neighborhood/Kentucky/Louisville/Southside/National-Origin

External links
The Americana Apartment complex sits in the heart of the area designated as the Southside Neighborhood. See "Our History"
Street map of Southside
   Images of Southside (Louisville, Ky.) in the University of Louisville Libraries Digital Collections

Neighborhoods in Louisville, Kentucky